The Coimbatore Metropolitan Area, or Coimbatore Urban Agglomeration, is the sixteenth-most populous metropolitan area in India, the second most populous metropolitan area in  the state of Tamil Nadu next only to Chennai. The Coimbatore Metropolitan Area consists of the city of Coimbatore and its suburbs in Coimbatore district.

Economy 

The economy of the metropolitan area of Coimbatore is heavily influenced by information technology, engineering and textiles at recent times. The city has four special economic zones (SEZ), namely, ELCOT SEZ, CHIL SEZ, SPAN Venture SEZ, Aspen SEZ and at least five more SEZs are in the pipeline. Coimbatore has trade associations like CODISSIA, COINDIA and COJEWEL representing industries in the city. The Government of Tamil Nadu has proposed for setting up an Industrial park at Sulur. Coimbatore also has Engineering SEZ in the outskirts of city "Aspen SEZ" spread over 376 acres. CODISSIA Industrial Park is being set up at Moperipalayam nearly 260 acres and at Kallapalayam nearly 150 acres. The city already has industrial estates owned by SIDCO at Kurichi, SIDCO at Malumichampatti, Electrical & Electronics Industrial Estate at Kalapatti and Sree Suba Ganesh Industrial estate near Kovilpalayam. The large number of engineering colleges in the region producing about 50,000 engineers. Indian Railways has "Southern Railway Signal & Telecom Workshop" in Podanur which is a manufacturing unit for Electrical & Communication division of Indian Railways. "L&T - MBDA Missile Systems" is a joint venture setting up a new unit in Aspen SEZ, Coimbatore to manufacture defense products. Coimbatore urban agglomeration has more than 700 wet grinder manufacturers with a monthly output, of 75,000 units per every 100,000 produced in India. The term "Coimbatore Wet Grinder" was given a Geographical indication for wet grinders manufactured in Coimbatore in 2006. Coimbatore is also home to a common facility for the manufacturers of wet grinders.

The city is the second largest software producer in Tamil Nadu, next only to Chennai. IT and BPO industry in the city has grown greatly with the launch of TIDEL Park Coimbatore & Wipro Software Development Centre in ELCOT SEZ, KCT TechPark, Hanudev Infopark, Rathinam Technopark, KGISL Campus, Span Venture SEZ, Elysium Central and other planned IT parks in and around the city. It is ranked at 17th among the global outsourcing cities. Companies like Amazon, Altran, Bosch, Cognizant, Ford, Tata Consultancy Services, Wipro, HCL Technologies, Ericsson, Cameron International, NTT DATA, Harman, ThoughtWorks, McWane, State Street Corporation, Tessolve, IQVIA, Deloitte, Owler, Access Healthcare, UST Global, Impiger Technologies Pvt. Ltd, Pactron India Pvt Ltd and Nous Infosystems having a presence in the city. Cognizant has second largest headcount in the country with more than 15000+ employees in the city. And Bosch has the second largest development center in Coimbatore outside Germany with 5500+ employees in the city. Software export stood more than 15,000 crores for the financial year 2018–2019, which is second largest in the state after Chennai.
TICEL Bio-Park III, a Bio-Technology Park is being constructed in 10 acres of land at Somayampalayam, Coimbatore which is set to open in Jan-2020
Due to huge demand from IT Companies for space at Coimbatore, TIDEL Park Coimbatore-Phase-II is planned to be built within ELCOT SEZ in additional 6 acres of land with 5 Lakh sq.feet space at 250 crores.

List 
Below is the list of towns which comprise the Coimbatore Metropolitan Area.

Coimbatore Metro 

The Coimbatore Metro Rail has proposed five corridors to serve the Coimbatore metropolitan area.

Composition 

The Coimbatore urban agglomeration is a metropolitan area in Tamil Nadu state, consisting of the city of Coimbatore and its suburbs. It consists of a municipal corporation and suburban areas spread out in parts of Coimbatore district.

Municipal corporations 
Coimbatore City Municipal Corporation

Municipalities 
Gudalur (Coimbatore district)
Karumathampatti
Madukkarai

Town Panchayats 
Alanthurai
Chettipalayam
Dhaliyur
Ettimadai
Idikarai
Irugur
Kannampalayam
Mopperipalayam
Narasimhanaickenpalayam
Othakalmandapam
Pallapalayam
Periyanaickenpalayam
Perur
Pooluvapatti
Sarcarsamakulam
Sulur
Thenkarai
Thirumalayampalayam
Thondamuthur
Vedapatti
Veerapandi, Coimbatore
Vellalore

Districts 
Coimbatore district (partial)

Taluks 
From Coimbatore district
Coimbatore North
Coimbatore South
Sulur(partial)
Perur
Madukkarai
Kinathukadavu (partial)
Annur (partial)

Transport
The Regional Transport offices in the Coimbatore metropolitan area are TN-37 (Coimbatore South), TN-38 (Coimbatore North), TN-66 (Coimbatore Central), TN-99 (Coimbatore West) and Unit offices such as TN-37Z (Sulur).

See also

 Chennai metropolitan area
 Madurai metropolitan area
 Salem metropolitan area
 Tiruchirappalli metropolitan area
 List of million-plus urban agglomerations in India
 List of districts in Tamil Nadu by Human Development Index
 List of urban agglomerations in Tamil Nadu
 List of metropolitan areas in India

References 

Metropolitan areas of Tamil Nadu
Geography of Coimbatore